The Roman Catholic Diocese of Maumere (Dioecesis Maumerensis) in Indonesia was created on December 14, 2005, by splitting it from the Archdiocese of Ende, which is still the metropolitan of the diocese. Its first bishop is Vincentius Sensi. The St Joseph church in Maumere is the cathedral of the diocese.

The diocese covers an area of 1,732 km², coinciding with the civil district Sikka on the eastern part of the island Flores. As of 2005, 259,598 of the 270,000 people in the area are members of the Catholic Church. The diocese is subdivided into 35 parishes.

See also
List of Roman Catholic dioceses in Indonesia

References

External links
GCatholic.org
Catholic-hierarchy.org
Vatican press release on the creation
Diocese of Maumere

Roman Catholic dioceses in Indonesia
Christian organizations established in 2005
Roman Catholic dioceses and prelatures established in the 21st century